Lü Yan (born 19 October 1981) is a Chinese fashion designer, supermodel, and actress. During her career as a model she worked with such labels as Dior, Gucci, Lanvin and Alexander McQueen before appearing on the cover of numerous fashion magazines including Marie Claire and i-D. Now retired from modelling, Lü is a fashion designer with her own label Comme Moi.

Early life 
Lü was born 1981 in a small mining village in De'an County, Jiangxi Province, China.

Career 
In 1999, at the age of 18 Lü was discovered by stylist Li Dongtian. However owing to Lü's unconventional appearance with small eyes, a flat face and freckles she did not meet traditional Chinese beauty standards and found getting work difficult. While in Beijing she was seen by model scouts from France who asked her to go to Paris to model. Lü who spoke no French or English eventually agreed to go to Paris and started work. In the same year she came second in the 2000 Supermodel of the World competition.

In 2006, Lü debuted her film career in 2006 The Painted Veil.

In 2010 Lü returned to China and retired from modelling to set up her own line called Comme Moi for label Woolmark.
In 2012, Lü's portrait was on the cover of Elle magazine.

Filmography 
 2006 The Painted Veil - Wan Xi.
 2010 Hot Summer Days - Supermodel.
 2010 Color Me Love

References

External links 
 Lü Yan at fashionmodeldirectory.com (with images)
 Lü Yan at bellazon.com
 Lü Yan at dresstokillmagazine.com
 
 Lu Yan at hkmdb.com
 Lü Yan at luxe.co

Living people
1981 births
Chinese female models
Chinese fashion designers
People from Jiujiang
Chinese women fashion designers